Neal John O'Raw has been the Church of Ireland Archdeacon of Glendalough since 2018.

O'Raw was ordained in 2003. After  a curacy at Killala Cathedral he held incumbencies at Crossmolina and Donoughmore.

References

Archdeacons of Glendalough
21st-century Irish Anglican priests
Living people
Year of birth missing (living people)